The men's 50 metre freestyle competition of the swimming events at the 1999 Pan American Games took place on 6 August at the Pan Am Pool. The last Pan American Games champion was Fernando Scherer of Brazil.

This race consisted of one length of the pool in freestyle.

Results
All times are in minutes and seconds.

Heats
The first round was held on August 6.

B Final 
The B final was held on August 6.

A Final 
The A final was held on August 6.

References

Swimming at the 1999 Pan American Games